Facundo Bagnis was the defending champion, but lost in the semifinals to Marco Trungelliti.

Gonzalo Lama won the title, defeating Trungelliti 6–3, 4–6, 6–3 in the final.

Seeds

Draw

Finals

Top half

Bottom half

References
 Main Draw
 Qualifying Draw

Seguros Bolivar Open Cali - Singles
2014 Singles
2014 in Colombian tennis